Varacosa is a genus of spiders in the family Lycosidae. It was first described in 1942 by Chamberlin & Ivie. , it contains 6 North American species.

Species
Varacosa comprises the following species:
Varacosa apothetica (Wallace, 1947)
Varacosa avara (Keyserling, 1877)
Varacosa gosiuta (Chamberlin, 1908)
Varacosa hoffmannae Jiménez & Dondale, 1988
Varacosa parthenus (Chamberlin, 1925)
Varacosa shenandoa (Chamberlin & Ivie, 1942)

References

Lycosidae
Araneomorphae genera
Spiders of North America